Yevhen Anatoliyovych Zubeyko (born 30 September 1989) is a Ukrainian professional footballer who plays as a right back for German club Eintracht Emseloh.

References

External links 
 Player's profile on Chornomorets Odesa official website (Russian)
 
 
 

1989 births
Living people
People from Bakhmut
Ukrainian footballers
Association football defenders
FC Chornomorets Odesa players
FC Chornomorets-2 Odesa players
FC Tosno players
FC Metalist Kharkiv players
FC Karpaty Lviv players
FC Olimpik Donetsk players
FC Minsk players
FC Viktoriya Mykolaivka players
FC Alians Lypova Dolyna players
Ukrainian Premier League players
Ukrainian First League players
Ukrainian Second League players
Belarusian Premier League players
Russian First League players
Ukrainian expatriate footballers
Expatriate footballers in Russia
Ukrainian expatriate sportspeople in Russia
Expatriate footballers in Belarus
Ukrainian expatriate sportspeople in Belarus
Expatriate footballers in Germany
Ukrainian expatriate sportspeople in Germany
Sportspeople from Donetsk Oblast